Twin Lakes are located in Glacier National Park, in the U. S. state of Montana. Fusillade Mountain rises to the south above the lakes. A spur off the Gunsight Pass Trail leads to Florence Falls which are below the Twin Lakes.

See also
List of lakes in Glacier County, Montana

References

Lakes of Glacier National Park (U.S.)
Lakes of Glacier County, Montana